Zodwa Mkandla is a prominent Zimbabwean businesswoman and philanthropist. In May 2017, she was recognised as International Business Woman of the Year at The Women4Africa Award and was included in the list of top 100 Women in the Tourism and Travel industry in Africa.

Background

Zodwa was born in 1972 in Mbembesi, Bubi in Matebeleland province. She had her early education at Mqwashini then proceeded to Mt. Pleasant High School for her secondary education then moved back to Bulawayo to St. Columbus where she finished her high school. In 2003, Zodwa Mkandla established Traverze Travel and the company has won several awards over the years including Fly emirates award as the best performing travel agent in Zimbabwe and was also nominated at the World Travel Awards 2021. The company is the first travel agency in Zimbabwe to own an executive lounge at the Harare International Airport.

In an interview in 2018, Zodwa announced that she is the godmother of Tanzanian artist Diamond Platnumz daughter. In 2021, Zodwa Mkandla was appointed into the ZANU PF Resource Mobilisation Committee by the president of Zimbabwe Emmerson Mnangagwa.

Recognition

Outstanding Woman CEO of the Year - Megafest Women's Awards 2018
Tourism & Hospitality Businesswoman of the Year Award - Zimbabwe Leadership Awards - ZILA Nationals 2017
Outstanding Woman of the Year - Megafest Women's Awards 2017
International Business Woman of the Year - Women4Africa Awards UK 2017
Business Woman of the Year Tourism and Hospitality Services Industry - Women4Africa Awards UK 2017
Top Female Business Leader of the Year - Women's Business and Leadership Awards 2018
Top Female Business Leader of the Year - International Women's Entrepreneurial Challenge (IWEC) 2016 Business Award
1st runner up Business Woman of the Year - Megafest Awards 2016
Winner – Tourism category - Zimbabwe National Chamber of Commerce Women in Business Awards (WECA) 2015
Top Female Travel & Tours Business Woman of the Year, Top Female Managing Director of the Year, Top Female Tourism & Hospitality Business Woman of the Year - Women's Heritage Society World Organization Awards 2015
1st runner up Business Woman of the Year - Megafest Awards 2014
Business Woman of the Year Harare, 1st Runner-up Business Woman of the Year - National level Zimbabwe National Chamber of Commerce 2010

References

Living people
Zimbabwean businesspeople
Year of birth missing (living people)